Cool Ridge Water is a brand of Spring water. It is a division of Schweppes Australia.

See also

 Australasian Bottled Water Institute (ABWI)

References

External links
 
 

Bottled water brands
Drink companies of Australia
Australian drinks
Asahi Breweries